José Morales may refer to:

Sports
José Morales (footballer, born 1909) (1909–1944), former Peru international footballer
José Morales (designated hitter) (born 1944), former designated hitter in Major League Baseball from the U.S. Virgin Islands
José Morales (catcher) (born 1983), Puerto Rican Major League Baseball catcher 
José Morales (pentathlete) (born 1901), Mexican modern pentathlete
José Leonardo Morales (born 1978), Venezuelan football goalkeeper
José Luis Morales Martín (born 1973), retired Spanish footballer
José Luis Morales Nogales (born 1987), Spanish footballer
José Morales (footballer, born 1996), Guatemalan footballer

Other
José María Morales (1818–1894), military officer and Afro-Argentine legislator
José María Morales (film producer), Spanish film producer